The 2022 ARCA Menards Series was the 70th season of the ARCA Menards Series, a stock car racing series sanctioned by NASCAR in the United States. The season began at Daytona International Speedway with the Lucas Oil 200 on February 19 and ended with the Shore Lunch 200 at Toledo Speedway on October 8.

Ty Gibbs, the 2021 series champion, ran full-time for Joe Gibbs Racing in the NASCAR Xfinity Series in 2022 and therefore did not return to run full-time in the ARCA Menards Series and defend his title.

Nick Sanchez won his first championship in the series in 2022. It was the first championship for Rev Racing in the main ARCA Series and their first NASCAR/ARCA championship since winning the 2012 East Series title with Kyle Larson. Sanchez, who is Hispanic, is also the first driver in NASCAR's Drive for Diversity program to win a championship while a member of the program since Larson in 2012. He is also the first driver of Hispanic ancestry to win an ARCA championship.

The race at Milwaukee also featured six female drivers competing in the race (Amber Balcaen, Toni Breidinger, Mandy Chick, Stephanie Moyer, Amber Slagle, and Rita Thomason). This tied a record for the series, as six female drivers also ran the 2010 season-opener at Daytona (Jennifer Jo Cobb, Milka Duno, Jill George, Leilani Münter, Alli Owens and Danica Patrick).

Teams and drivers
Note: If a driver is listed as their own crew chief for a particular race, that means that their entry in that race was a start and park.

Complete schedule

Limited schedule

Notes

Changes

Teams
 On August 30, 2021, it was announced that Rev Racing would be expanding to two full-time cars in the main ARCA Menards Series with Rajah Caruth, who drove full-time for the team in the East Series in 2021, driving the second car. Nick Sanchez will return to the team full-time in the other car. (As a result, the team will not field a full-time car in the East Series in 2022.)
 Miles Thomas Motorsports will debut in 2022. The team will compete full-time or part-time in both the ARCA Menards Series and Xfinity Series with Jason Miles, who is also a co-owner of the team. Miles competed part-time in ARCA for Fast Track Racing in 2019 and 2021. Ford will be their manufacturer. The team has yet to announce their car number, sponsors, and crew chief.
 On October 29, 2021, GMS Racing announced that Daniel Dye, who drove their No. 21 car part-time in the main ARCA Series and the East Series in 2021, would run full-time in the same car in 2022 in the main ARCA Series. It will be the first time since 2015 that GMS has fielded a full-time car in the main ARCA Series. On December 10, Dye announced that the car number would change to the No. 43, which was his late model racing number, a number he used in the East Series with Ben Kennedy Racing, as well as a number that GMS will use in the Cup Series in 2022 as a result of the team purchasing the majority of Richard Petty Motorsports to become Petty GMS Motorsports (although this ARCA car will remain a GMS car and not become a Petty GMS car).
 On March 22, 2022, Team Stange Racing announced that they would be returning to ARCA with their No. 46 car, which was last fielded in the 2016 season-opener at Daytona with Frank Kimmel running his second-to-last ARCA race. Formula 2 and Formula 3 driver Matteo Nannini will make his stock car debut in that car in the race at Mid-Ohio. The team did not end up entering the race at Mid-Ohio.
 On March 25, 2022, Rugiet Racing announced that they would make their debut in the series with Richard Garvie driving the No. 84 car at Talladega. However, Rugiet would end up partnering with Fast Track Racing (a team Garvie has previously driven for) to jointly field the No. 10 car in that race with Garvie driving. On April 29, the team revealed that they would also attempt the race at Charlotte. The team did not end up entering the race at Charlotte.
 On August 4, 2022, Tim Goulet Enterprises announced that they would make their debut in the series with Rita Thomason driving the No. 31 car at Watkins Glen. However, Tim Goulet would end up partnering with Wayne Peterson Racing to jointly field the No. 06 car in that race with Thomason driving. On the Milwaukee entry list, the team revealed that they would also attempt that race.

Drivers
 With Ty Gibbs all but confirmed to be moving up to the Xfinity Series full-time in 2022, Sammy Smith, the 2021 ARCA Menards Series East champion, is likely to return to Joe Gibbs Racing to drive the No. 18 car in most of the races in the main ARCA Series in 2022. However, because he will not turn 18 (the minimum age to race at all tracks) until June 4, 2022, he will need to miss all of the races at the larger tracks (such as Daytona and Talladega) that happen before then. Smith confirmed to Frontstretch that this was likely the plan, and that Mark McFarland would return as his crew chief in 2022.
 On October 29, 2021, GMS Racing announced that Daniel Dye, who drove their No. 21 car part-time in the main ARCA Series and the East Series in 2021, would run full-time in the same car (later renumbered to the No. 43) in 2022 in the main ARCA Series. Dye will turn 18 on December 4, 2021, after which he will be eligible to run all the races. On April 27, 2022, ARCA indefinitely suspended Dye due to his arrest on a felony battery charge in Volusia County, Florida. On May 13, ARCA announced that Dye would be reinstated after his charges were reduced by the Florida state attorney's office. Dye did not end up missing any races as none had occurred during the time he was suspended.
 On January 3, 2022, Rette Jones Racing announced that Amber Balcaen would drive their No. 30 car full-time in 2022.
 On January 3, 2022, Venturini Motorsports announced that Corey Heim would return to the No. 20 car for 6 events, while Jesse Love will run for ROTY by running 14 events.
 On January 11, 2022, it was announced that Connor Mosack would join Bret Holmes Racing to drive their No. 23 car in 10 races.
 On January 13, 2022, Venturini Motorsports announced that Toni Breidinger would drive their No. 25 car full-time in 2022. She previously drove part-time in the series in 2018 for Venturini and in 2021 for Venturini as well as Young's Motorsports.
 On January 18, 2022, it was announced that Brayton Laster would attempt the race at Daytona in the No. 03 car for Mullins Racing in a collaboration with Clubb Racing Inc.
 On February 8, 2022, it was revealed that Tim Richmond would return to driving part-time for his team, Richmond Motorsports, in 2022 after having suffered an injury in the race at Michigan in 2021. On the Berlin entry list, it was revealed that Dallas Frueh would make his debut in Richmond's No. 27 Chevy.
 On February 15, 2022, Max Gutiérrez would drive for AM Racing, at Daytona with the Rette Jones Racing banner and using the No. 32. Gutiérrez would drive that car again at Talladega.
 On February 15, 2022, Bryce Haugeberg would drive for his own team, Haugeberg Racing, at Daytona in a partnership with Cram Racing Enterprises and using CRE's number, the No. 94. Haugeberg would drive that car again at Talladega and would partner with Fast Track Racing to jointly field the No. 11 car at Phoenix and Kansas in May with him driving it.
 On February 15, 2022, Brian Kaltreider and his team Mystic Motorsports would return to ARCA after 3 years away after the 2018 fire shop mishap.
 On March 6, 2022, it was announced that Ryan Roulette would attempt 5 races in the No. 85 car for Last Chance Racing.
 On April 1, 2022, it was revealed that Christian Rose would attempt 9 races in the main ARCA series, 5 races in the East Series, and 3 races in the West Series for Cook Racing Technologies.
 On the Talladega entry list, Thad Moffitt would drive the No. 44 for Jeff McClure. It was a Ford on the entry list, but due to an Instagram post, it would be a Chevy, most likely because he drove a Chevy while competing for Reaume Brothers Racing in the Truck Series.
 On April 19, 2022, it was shown that Jon Garrett would make his ARCA debut at Talladega with Fast Track's No. 11.
 On April 20, 2022, it was revealed that A. J. Moyer would attempt 3 races (Talladega, Salem and Toledo) with Wayne Peterson Racing. He drove the No. 0 at Talladega and will most likely drive the No. 06 at Salem and Toledo.
 On April 26, 2022, Venturini Motorsports announced that Jake Finch would attempt the No. 55 at Pocono, in addition to his lone East Series race for the team at Dover.
 On the Spring Kansas entry list, it was revealed that Ron Vandermeir Jr. will attempt the No. 27. The car was a Ford and it was his own team's entry instead of Richmond's. He also drove the No. 44 at Iowa with his own team instead of Ferrier's.
 On May 25, 2022, it was announced that Brandon Jones would return to the series to run five races (Charlotte, Iowa, Pocono, Watkins Glen and Bristol) in the No. 81 car for Joe Gibbs Racing. The races at Iowa and Bristol are also combination races with the ARCA Menards Series East. Although JGR sold their ARCA team to Kyle Busch Motorsports before the start of the 2022 season, this entry will be a JGR car and not a KBM car.
 On the Charlotte entry list, it was revealed that Matt Wilson would make his debut for CCM Racing. He previously made his debut in the No. 10 for Fast Track Racing at Nashville in the ARCA East Series.
 On the Elko entry list, it was revealed that Colton Collins would make his debut in the No. 7 car for CCM Racing.
 On June 30, 2022, it was announced that Joe Cooksey would return to the series for the first time since 2018 to run the race at DuQuoin for Fast Track Racing. Cooksey stated that it could end up being his final ARCA start. Ken Schrader will also return to the series to run the race at DuQuoin for Fast Track as he did in 2021. Schrader drove the 11 at both dirt races, and Cooksey secured a top-10 finish at DuQuoin.
 On the Mid-Ohio entry list, it was revealed that Ed Bull (who failed to start in last year's Watkins Glen race) would attempt to run the race in the CCM Racing No. 7 car in a partnership with his own team.
 On the Mid-Ohio entry list, it was revealed that Casey Carden would attempt to run the race in the Mullins Racing No. 3 car in a partnership with Alex Clubb's team.
 On July 21, 2022, it was announced that Dylan Smith, who has been a late model racing driver, a pit crew and PR member for various NASCAR teams and currently works for NASCAR.com, would make his ARCA debut in the race at IRP in the No. 02 for Young's Motorsports.
 On the IRP entry list, it was revealed that Mandy Chick, who is the daughter of Steve Chick, would attempt to run the race in her own team in the No. 74 car.
 On the IRP entry list, it was revealed that Dylan Fetcho would attempt to run the race in the No. 95 for MAN Motorsports, which is the team that previously made their debut with Tanner Arms at Nashville in the ARCA East Series.
 On the Michigan entry list, it was revealed that Cody Coughlin would make his first ever ARCA sanctioned start since 2015, with his own team Coughlin Brothers Racing driving the No. 72.
 On the Watkins Glen entry list, it was revealed that Chris Werth would attempt to run the race in the No. 71 for New York-based team CK Motorsports.
 On the Milwaukee entry list, it was revealed that Amber Slagle would attempt to run the race in a second car for Cook Racing Technologies, the No. 24 (reverse of No. 42).
 On the Milwaukee entry list, it was revealed that Matt Gould, who is the son of Niece Motorsports team owner Phil Gould, would attempt to run the race in his No. 40 car.

Crew chiefs
 On January 11, 2022, it was announced that Brad Parrott would be the crew chief for Rajah Caruth's No. 6 car for Rev Racing in 2022. Glenn Parker was Caruth's crew chief in 2021 when he ran part-time in the main ARCA Series and full-time in the East Series. His Rev Racing teammate Nick Sanchez also got a new crew chief for 2022, as Matt Bucher replaced Steve Plattenberger.
 Kevin Reed Jr. replaced Billy Venturini as a full-time crew chief for Venturini Motorsports in 2022. He previously had been a crew chief if the team fielded a part-time car or an interim crew chief on one of the team's full-time cars if needed. He is the son of Kevin Reed, another full-time crew chief for VMS. Reed Sr. is crew chiefing the No. 15 car (driven by multiple drivers) and Reed Jr. is crew chiefing the No. 25 car (driven by Toni Breidinger). This move allowed Billy Venturini to focus solely on the ownership side of the team.

Interim crew chiefs
 On May 14, 2022, Shannon Rursch, the crew chief of the No. 20 Venturini Motorsports car, missed the race at Kansas that day in order to attend his daughter's college graduation ceremony as was stated on the Fox TV broadcast. VMS team owner and former crew chief Billy Venturini filled in as the interim crew chief for the No. 20 car, driven by Corey Heim, in that race.

Manufacturers
 On October 7, 2021, an article on Frontstretch revealed that Rev Racing would receive manufacturer support from Chevy in 2022, which they did not have in 2021 despite being a Chevy team.
 2022 marked the first year that the Ford Mustang was an eligible body style, as the Ford Fusion had long since been discontinued. However, the body was not widely adopted by Ford teams until 2023.

Schedule
Some tracks announced their 2022 race dates before the release of the entire schedule on October 29, 2021.

Notes:
 The race at Phoenix in March was a combination race with the ARCA Menards Series West (highlighted in gold).
 The races at Iowa, Milwaukee and Bristol are combination races with the ARCA Menards Series East (highlighted in silver).

Schedule changes
 Lucas Oil Indianapolis Raceway Park, which has had a race on the schedule each year since 2011 except for 2013 and 2021, returns to the schedule, replacing Winchester Speedway. It will have an ARCA Menards Series race (and a Truck Series race) on July 29.
 The races at Iowa Speedway, Berlin Raceway and Elko Speedway all move from July to June.
 The races at Mid-Ohio Sports Car Course and Pocono Raceway both move from June to July.
 The fall race at Kansas Speedway, which was previously the season-finale, moves from October to September along with the weekend's Cup Series race.
 The race at Toledo Speedway, which was previously in May, will now be the season-finale in October.

Broadcasting
The TV lineup is similar to what it looked like in 2021, with FS1 airing almost all of the races that occur at tracks that the NASCAR Cup, Xfinity and Truck Series go to and have races at on the same weekend as the ARCA Menards Series and FS1 is at the track to broadcast at least one of those series. The rest of the races are aired on MAVTV. The only races that FS1 is not broadcasting where the Cup, Xfinity and/or Truck Series does have a race at on the same weekend are Phoenix and Kansas, which are both on MAVTV.

NBC Sports TrackPass, which previously had the streaming rights to all of the MAVTV races, lost the rights to FloRacing. The Fox Sports App will continue to stream all of the races on FS1.

Results and standings

Race results

Drivers' championship

Notes: 
 The pole winner also receives 1 bonus point, similar to the previous ARCA points system used until 2019 and unlike NASCAR. 
 Additionally, after groups of 5 races of the season, drivers that compete in all 5 races receive 50 additional points. These points bonuses will be given after the races at Charlotte, Pocono, Milwaukee and Toledo.
 Rajah Caruth, Nick Sanchez, Daniel Dye, Toni Breidinger, Amber Balcaen, Greg Van Alst, Zachary Tinkle and Brad Smith received this points bonus for having competed in the first 5 races of the season (Daytona, Phoenix, Talladega, Kansas in May, and Charlotte). Caruth, Sanchez, Dye, Breidinger, Balcaen, Van Alst, Brad Smith, Sammy Smith, Taylor Gray, Jesse Love and D. L. Wilson received the 50 bonus points for having competed in the next 5 races (Iowa, Berlin, Elko, Mid-Ohio and Pocono). Caruth, Sanchez, Dye, Van Alst, Breidinger, Balcaen, Brad Smith, Sammy Smith, Tinkle and Tim Monroe received the 50 bonus points after having competed the next 5 races (Indianapolis, Michigan, Watkins Glen, Springfield and Milwaukee). Caruth, Sanchez, Dye, Van Alst, Breidinger, Balcaen, Brad Smith, Sammy Smith, Tinkle, Monroe and Alex Clubb received the 50 bonus points after competing in the last 5 races (DuQuoin, Kansas, Bristol, Salem and Toledo).

(key) Bold – Pole position awarded by time. Italics – Pole position set by final practice results or rainout. * – Most laps led. ** – All laps led.

See also
 2022 NASCAR Cup Series
 2022 NASCAR Xfinity Series
 2022 NASCAR Camping World Truck Series
 2022 ARCA Menards Series East
 2022 ARCA Menards Series West
 2022 NASCAR Whelen Modified Tour
 2022 NASCAR Pinty's Series
 2022 NASCAR Mexico Series
 2022 NASCAR Whelen Euro Series
 2022 SRX Series

References

External links
 Official website

ARCA Menards Series seasons
ARCA
ARCA